The men's 110 metres hurdles at the 1954 European Athletics Championships was held in Bern, Switzerland, at Stadion Neufeld on 25, 26, and 29 August 1954.

Medalists

Results

Final
29 August

Semi-finals
26 August

Semi-final 1

Semi-final 2

Heats
25 August

Heat 1

Heat 2

Heat 3

Heat 4

Participation
According to an unofficial count, 22 athletes from 15 countries participated in the event.

 (2)
 (2)
 (1)
 (2)
 (1)
 (1)
 (2)
 (1)
 (2)
 (1)
 (2)
 (1)
 (2)
 (1)
 (1)

References

110 metres hurdles
Sprint hurdles at the European Athletics Championships